Marshall James McDougall (born December 19, 1978) is a former professional baseball player. Primarily a third baseman, he has played part of one season in Major League Baseball with the Texas Rangers, and one season in the Chinese Professional Baseball League with the Uni-President 7-Eleven Lions.

College career
McDougall, who bats and throws right-handed, played college baseball for the Florida State University Seminoles (1999–2000), where he played under head coach Mike Martin and was a first team consensus All-American in 1999. In that same year, he was a finalist for the Golden Spikes Award and the Dick Howser Trophy. He was named the Most Outstanding Player at the 1999 College World Series.

He will perhaps always be most famous for his performance on May 9, 1999, where, against the University of Maryland Terrapins, his 7-for-7 performance at the plate with 6 home runs, 16 RBI, and 25 total bases shattered NCAA single game records in all three categories.

After the 1999 season, he played collegiate summer baseball with the Harwich Mariners of the Cape Cod Baseball League.

Professional career
McDougall was drafted by the Oakland Athletics in the 9th round of the 2000 MLB Draft and played in the Athletics organization until July 30, 2002, when he was traded to the Cleveland Indians for Ricardo Rincón. After playing the rest of the season with Single-A Mahoning Valley and Double-A Akron, McDougall was selected in the 2002 Rule 5 draft by the Texas Rangers. He played in Texas' organization, making his MLB debut on June 7, 2005, until released on June 29, 2006. He played in the Los Angeles Dodgers organization in 2007 and the San Diego Padres organization in 2008.

In 2009, McDougall played for the Broncos de Reynosa, and in 2010 he signed with the CPBL's Lions. He returned to the Broncos for the 2011 season. He has also played for the Algodoneros de Guasave in the Mexican Pacific League.

References

External links
, or CPBL

1978 births
Living people
Akron Aeros players
All-American college baseball players
American expatriate baseball players in Canada
American expatriate baseball players in Mexico
American expatriate baseball players in Taiwan
Baseball players from Florida
Broncos de Reynosa players
College World Series Most Outstanding Player Award winners
Florida State Seminoles baseball players
Frisco RoughRiders players
Harwich Mariners players
Jacksonville Suns players
Las Vegas 51s players
Mahoning Valley Scrappers players
Major League Baseball third basemen
Mexican League baseball shortstops
Mexican League baseball third basemen
Midland RockHounds players
Oklahoma RedHawks players
Pensacola Pelicans players
Portland Beavers players
San Antonio Missions players
Texas Rangers players
Uni-President 7-Eleven Lions players
Vancouver Canadians players
Visalia Oaks players
Junior college baseball players in the United States